Kelli L. James (born March 16, 1970) is a former field hockey striker from the United States, who earned a total number of 144 caps for the Women's National Team. The former student of the Old Dominion University tied for team scoring lead at the 1999 Pan American Games with 3 goals, and scored four goals in a single match in 4–0 win over China at the 1998 World Cup in Utrecht, Netherlands.
She won a bronze medal at the 1995 Pan American Games.

Life 
James grew up in Medford, New Jersey and attended Bishop Eustace Preparatory School.

College
In 1993, while at Old Dominion, James won the Honda Award (now the Honda Sports Award) as the nation's best field hockey player.

International Senior Tournaments
 1991 – Pan American Games, Havana, Cuba (3rd)
 1994 – World Cup, Dublin, Ireland (3rd)
 1995 – Pan American Games, Mar del Plata, Argentina (2nd)
 1995 – Champions Trophy, Mar del Plata, Argentina (3rd)
 1996 – Summer Olympics, Atlanta, USA (5th)
 1997 – Champions Trophy, Berlin, Germany (6th)
 1998 – World Cup, Utrecht, The Netherlands (8th)
 1999 – Pan American Games, Winnipeg, Canada (2nd)
 2000 – Olympic Qualifying Tournament, Milton Keynes, England (6th)

References

External links
 
 Profile on US Field Hockey

1970 births
Living people
American female field hockey players
Field hockey players at the 1996 Summer Olympics
Old Dominion Monarchs field hockey players
Olympic field hockey players of the United States
Bishop Eustace Preparatory School alumni
People from Medford, New Jersey
Pan American Games silver medalists for the United States
Pan American Games bronze medalists for the United States
Pan American Games medalists in field hockey
Field hockey players at the 1991 Pan American Games
Field hockey players at the 1995 Pan American Games
Field hockey players at the 1999 Pan American Games
Medalists at the 1991 Pan American Games
Medalists at the 1995 Pan American Games
Medalists at the 1999 Pan American Games